Bowman is an unincorporated community in Madison Township, Pike County, in the U.S. state of Indiana.

History
A post office was established at Bowman in 1888, and remained in operation until 1901. The community's name honors Jonathan Bowman, an early settler.

Geography

References

Unincorporated communities in Pike County, Indiana
Unincorporated communities in Indiana